The Weedon Island Preserve is a 3,190 acre natural area situated along the western shore of Tampa Bay, and located on 1800 Weedon Drive NE. St. Petersburg, Florida, United States. It is predominately an estuarine preserve composed of upland and aquatic ecosystems such as mangrove forests, pine/scrubby flatwoods, and maritime hammock, and is home to a variety of native wildlife. The preserve is also a designated archaeological area with several shell mounds identified on the property that provide evidence of early peoples who inhabited the land for thousands of years.

On June 13, 1972, Weedon Island Preserve was added to the U.S. National Register of Historic Places. In 1974 the state of Florida purchased Weedon Island and its surrounding islands and it officially opened for public use in December 1980. In 1993, the state created a lease agreement with Pinellas County to manage and maintain the preserve. The county's Department of Parks and Conservation Resources presently manages the area.

Weedon Island Preserve's name is derived from Tampa doctor and amateur archaeologist, Leslie Washington Weedon.

Recreational Activities 
The preserve offers a total of 4.7 miles of nature trails for hiking with 2 miles out of the total as boardwalks and paved trails that are ADA accessible, and the remaining 2.7 miles as natural trail loops. The 3,000 foot Tower Boardwalk trail leads visitors to a 45-foot tall observation tower, the tallest of its kind in Pinellas County. With favorable weather conditions, one can see much of the Preserve and Tampa Bay from this tower, as well as the cities of Tampa and St. Petersburg. Three additional observation platforms along the trails offer opportunities for bird and wildlife viewing, and are ideal for photography.

In addition to hiking, the preserve maintains a 4-mile, self-guided canoeing/kayaking loop called the South Paddling Trail. The path weaves through mangrove tunnels within the preserve and has access points to the bay. Visitors interested in exploring the paddling trail may bring their own vessels or take a tour through ECOmersion. ECOmersion is a kayak tour company located in the area whose purpose is to get people outside and connected with nature. ECOmersion's professional staff give tours when the tide is high for a once in a lifetime experience on Weedon Island Preserve. The tour leads through the tunnels of the iconic Florida mangroves on the preserve.

Other activities available include fishing from the Pier located at the end of Weedon Dr. NE and picnicking at any of designated picnic tables provided.

Weedon Island Preserve Cultural and Natural History Center
The Weedon Island Preserve Cultural and Natural History Center opened in the fall of 2002 through the support of the Friends of Weedon Island and is run by Pinellas County. The Center focuses on the natural, cultural and archaeological history of the preserve.  The Exhibit Hall features interactive displays on the unique wildlife and habitats found on Weedon Island, and the ancient and present-day history of the preserve. Part of the collection of Native American artifacts from Weedon Island has been digitized and is available online as a virtual tour.

The most recent addition to the Center is a  dugout canoe that was found in the Weedon Island Preserve that is believed to be a Manasotan artifact. It estimated to be 1,100 years old.

Ecosystem

Programs and Events 
Pinellas county staff and UF/IFAS Extension agents provide a wide variety of educational programs and events for the general public that are family-friendly and often free of charge.  Monthly programs may include guided hikes, archaeology classes, speaker series, photography or birding meet ups, and environmental sustainability workshops. Program registration and an updated list of current offerings are available through the preserve's Eventbrite page.

Hours of Operations
The Preserve is open seven days a week, from dawn to dusk. The Cultural and Natural History Center is open Thursdays through Saturdays from 9:00am to 4:00pm, and on Sundays from 11:00am to 4:00pm.

Gallery

References

External links

Weedon Island Preserve official site
Milanich, Jerald T., Ann S. Cordell and Vernon J. Knig. (1997) Archaeology of Northern Florida, A.D. 200-900: The McKeithen Weeden Island Culture University Press of Florida. 
Pinellas County listings at National Register of Historic Places
Florida's Office of Cultural and Historical Programs
 Pinellas County listings
Weedon Island Preserve

Weeden Island culture
Archaeological sites in Florida
Native American museums in Florida
Nature centers in Florida
Museums in Pinellas County, Florida
Natural history museums in Florida
Nature reserves in Florida
Parks in Pinellas County, Florida
National Register of Historic Places in Pinellas County, Florida
Florida Native American Heritage Trail
1972 establishments in Florida
Protected areas established in 1972